Li Senmao (1929 – June 18, 1996) was a politician of the People's Republic of China, and a Minister of Railways of China.

1929 births
1996 deaths
People's Republic of China politicians from Tianjin